Justice Smyth may refer to:

Constantine Joseph Smyth (1859–1924), chief justice of the Court of Appeals of the District of Columbia
Frederick Smyth (New York politician) (1832–1900), judge of the New York Supreme Court
George W. Smyth (Mississippi judge) (died 1832), justice of the Mississippi Supreme Court

See also
Sidney Smythe (1705–1778), British judge and politician
Justice Smith (disambiguation)